During British rule, Liberation Day celebration took place in Hong Kong on the last Monday in August to commemorate the liberation of Hong Kong from Japanese occupation on 30 August 1945. No official ceremonies have taken place in Hong Kong since the handover to China in 1997. Nevertheless, unofficial delegations mark the day at The Cenotaph, and the flag poles are occasionally dressed.

On September 9, 1998, the Holidays (Amendment) Bill 1998, which included the abolition of the public holiday for Liberation Day, was passed.

The Memorial Day of the War of Resistance was created after 1997, referring to the Second Sino-Japanese War.

References 

Public holidays in Hong Kong
August observances
Holidays and observances by scheduling (nth weekday of the month)